Yabogan (Ĵabagan) is a rural locality (a selo) and the administrative centre of Yaboganskoye Rural Settlement of Ust-Kansky District, the Altai Republic, Russia. The population was 1368 as of 2016. There are 9 streets.

Geography 
Yabogan is located 26 km east of Ust-Kan (the district's administrative centre) by road. Verkhny Yabogan is the nearest rural locality.

References 

Rural localities in Ust-Kansky District